

New York Theatre Workshop (NYTW) is an Off-Broadway theatre noted for its productions of new works.  Located at 79 East 4th Street between Second Avenue and Bowery in the East Village neighborhood of Manhattan, New York City, it houses a 198-seat theatre for its mainstage productions, and a 75-seat black box theatre for staged readings and developing work in the building next door, at 83 East 4th Street.

History
Founded by Stephen Graham, NYTW presents five to seven new productions, over 80 staged readings, and numerous workshop productions to an audience of over 60,000 patrons.

Some of the theatre's progeny – such as Rent and Dirty Blonde – have transferred to commercial productions. The new works of well-established playwrights, such as Caryl Churchill, Doug Wright, and Tony Kushner – a former NYTW associate artistic director – have also been produced at NYTW.  In keeping with its mission, NYTW continues to bring new work from theatre legends and emerging artists alike.  The theatre maintains connections with many theatrical artists, whom it refers to as "The Usual Suspects".

In 2005, NYTW purchased a vacant building at 72 East 4th Street, which it converted into scenic and costume shops. On January 11, 2006, Mayor Michael Bloomberg donated several city-owned buildings to arts organizations, including New York Theatre Workshop, on East Fourth Street, designating the block Fourth Arts Block.

James C. Nicola served as its artistic director from 1988 to June 2022. He is slated to be replaced by Patricia McGregor, who will succeed Nicola the position of artistic director in August 2022.

Affiliated artists

Alan Ball, writer/director
Anne Bogart, director
Rachel Chavkin, director
Caryl Churchill, writer
Martha Clarke, writer/director/choreographer
Daniel Craig, performer
Rinde Eckert, writer/composer
Elevator Repair Service, performance group
The Five Lesbian Brothers, performance group
Deb Filler, writer/ performer
Les Freres Corbusier, performance group
David Gordon, director/choreographer/writer
Tony Kushner, writer
Theater Mitu, performance group, company-in-residence
Jonathan Larson, writer/composer
Charles L. Mee, writer
Will Power, writer
Paul Rudnick, writer
Claudia Shear, writer/performer
Ivo van Hove, director
Naomi Wallace, writer
Doug Wright, writer/performer
UNIVERSES, writers/performance ensemble

References
Notes

External links

New York Theatre Workshop
NYTW's Casebook program on the American Theatre Wing's "Working in the Theatre" series.

Off-Broadway theaters
Theatre companies in New York City
Theatres in Manhattan
Arts organizations established in 1979
1979 establishments in New York City